Storckensohn (German: Storchensohn) is a commune in the Haut-Rhin department in Grand Est in north-eastern France.

Watermill

The watermill in Storckensohn dates from around 1820 and was used to grind oil-bearing seeds. It was restored in 1991.

See also
 Communes of the Haut-Rhin department

References

Communes of Haut-Rhin
Watermills in France
Articles containing video clips